Mark Eugene Grace (born June 28, 1964) is a former Major League Baseball (MLB) first baseman who spent 13 seasons with the Chicago Cubs and three seasons with the Arizona Diamondbacks of the National League (NL). He was a member of the 2001 World Series champion Diamondbacks that beat the New York Yankees. Grace batted and threw left-handed; he wore jersey number 28 and 17 during his rookie season of 1988, and he kept number 17 for the remainder of his career.

Career

Amateur career
Grace played high school baseball and basketball at Tustin High School in Tustin, California. After graduating high school in 1982, he first attended Saddleback College before transferring to San Diego State University to play for the San Diego State Aztecs. At the age of 19, he was drafted in the 15th round by the Minnesota Twins but he did not sign.

Chicago Cubs
The Chicago Cubs selected Grace in the 1985 Major League Baseball draft. He spent three years playing in the Cubs farm system before making his major league debut May 2, 1988.

Grace starred on Cubs teams that included Ryne Sandberg, Andre Dawson, Shawon Dunston and Sammy Sosa and was a consistent, steady hitter, compiling 2,445 hits and more than 500 doubles during his 16-year career and for a few years batted clean-up for the Cubs. He had a career on-base percentage of .383 and collected four Gold Glove Awards and was a three-time All-Star (1993, 1995, 1997). He holds the distinction of having the most hits and doubles of any player in the 1990s.

Grace helped lead the Cubs to the NL East division title in 1989 and the NL wild card in 1998. In the 1989 NLCS, Grace batted .647 in the five-game contest with a home run and three doubles, while driving in 8 of the total 16 runs scored by the Cubs in the series.

Grace led the team in average (.325), OBP (.393), hits (193), walks (71), doubles (39), and RBI (98 – a career high) in 1993 and was selected as an alternate to the NL All-Star team for the first time in his career. He also hit for the cycle on May 9 that year, and (as of the end of the 2018 season) is the most recent Cub to have done so. In 1995, Grace hit .326 with a .395 OBP and a .516 SLG, and hit 51 doubles (which led the NL). He was once again named to the NL All-Star team. Grace collected the most hits (1,754) and doubles (364) of any player in the 1990s . Grace and Pete Rose are the only Major League Baseball players to lead a decade in hits and not be in the Baseball Hall of Fame. Grace also had the most sacrifice flies in the 1990s with 73.

The song that played most frequently on the Wrigley Field organ prior to a Grace at bat was "Taking Care of Business", which Grace explained was due to his bit part in a Jim Belushi film of the same name.

Arizona Diamondbacks
Grace signed with the Arizona Diamondbacks on December 8, 2000, with a $6 million, two-year contract after the Cubs declined to offer salary arbitration. The deal included a mutual $3 million option year in 2003. He received $5.3 million in his last season with the Cubs but accepted less money for the opportunity to live year-round at his home in suburban Scottsdale, Arizona with his family. "For me to remain a Cub, the Cubs would have wanted to want me back and the Cubs would have had to win," Grace said at the time. "Neither of those happened and I'm one proud Diamondback now."

Grace wore his familiar number 17 in Arizona where he played for three more seasons, including helping the Diamondbacks win the 2001 World Series. Having never even visited Yankee Stadium, he belted a home run there in Game 4 of the series. In Game 7, Grace led off the bottom of the 9th inning with a single — his third of the game — off Yankee pitcher Mariano Rivera, which rallied the Arizona Diamondbacks to a come-from-behind victory for the franchise's first championship. His .515 career batting average in League Championship Series play is a record for players in at least ten games.

During a 19–1 defeat by the Los Angeles Dodgers in September 2002, Grace pitched one inning of relief. He surrendered one run on catcher David Ross's first career home run. Grace also impersonated teammate Mike Fetters, who from the stretch would take a deep breath and then quickly turned his head towards the catcher.

On September 26, 2003, Grace announced his retirement from baseball.

Coaching
Grace has stated a desire to manage a major league team at some point. He was considered for the Diamondbacks' managerial position following the 2004 season, but the Diamondbacks hired Bob Melvin instead.

Grace spent 2014 as hitting coach for the Diamondbacks' Class A Short Season affiliate Hillsboro Hops of the Northwest League. In 2015, he was promoted to the Diamondbacks to be their hitting coach. He was fired after the 2016 season.

Broadcasting career
After his retirement as a player, Grace continued his involvement in the game as a television color commentator for the Diamondbacks and for Fox Saturday Baseball. Grace used off-the-wall terms—such as "slumpbuster", "never-say-die-mondbacks", and "Gas!"—during broadcasts. He was paired with Thom Brennaman on television from 2004 to 2006, and was paired with Daron Sutton from 2007 to 2012.

Grace also agreed to a deal with Fox Sports in 2007. He originally rotated between the studio and the number three booth. He was then promoted to the number two booth with Thom Brennaman for the 2008 and 2009 season, and Dick Stockton for the 2010 season. He reunited with Brennaman in 2011 before leaving the network at the end of the regular season. He was replaced by Eric Karros who had worked on the number three team with Kenny Albert.

On August 24, 2012, Grace requested an indefinite leave of absence from the booth, and at the end of the 2012 season, the team announced that he would not be returning for the 2013 season.

In February 2017, Grace was named as a baseball analyst for Diamondbacks games by Fox Sports Arizona.

In February 2020, Grace was hired as an analyst for select Chicago Cubs games on Marquee Sports Network. Grace will continue his role with the Diamondbacks as the lead color commentator on Fox Sports Arizona.

Personal life
Grace was known to smoke cigarettes before and after Cub games, and reportedly at times, during games in the clubhouse.

On August 3, 2006, Grace led the Wrigley Field crowd in singing "Take Me Out to the Ball Game" during the seventh-inning stretch of the second game of a doubleheader between the Cubs and Diamondbacks; his appearance helped to improve his relationship with the Cubs, which had been strained since he left the team after the 2000 season.

Grace became eligible for the National Baseball Hall of Fame in 2009; 75% of the vote was necessary for induction, and 5% was necessary to stay on future ballots. Grace received 4.1% of the vote and was dropped from further ballots.

Grace's ex-wife, Michelle, was to married Ray Liotta from 1997 to 2004; they had met at a Cubs game. As of 2006, Grace is divorced from his second wife, Tanya, who starred on the VH1 show Baseball Wives.

Grace lived in Antioch, Tennessee, during a period of his childhood years. He currently resides in Paradise Valley, Arizona, with his sons Jackson Gene and Preston Torre.

Legal history
Grace has been arrested twice for driving under the influence; once in May 2011 and once in August 2012.

On October 3, 2012, a grand jury in Arizona indicted Grace on four felony counts stemming from his August 23, 2012, arrest in Scottsdale on suspicion of driving under the influence, driving with a suspended license and without an interlock device. The Diamondbacks announced the following day that Grace would not return to his television broadcasting duties with the club. He subsequently pleaded guilty and was sentenced to four months in jail on January 31, 2013. The sentence included work-release jail time as well as two years of supervised probation. An interlock device was required to be installed in his vehicle for six months.

See also

List of Major League Baseball career hits leaders
List of Major League Baseball career doubles leaders
List of Major League Baseball career runs scored leaders
List of Major League Baseball career runs batted in leaders
List of Major League Baseball annual doubles leaders
List of Major League Baseball players to hit for the cycle

References

Further reading
 Archived at Ghostarchive and the Wayback Machine: 
 Archived at Ghostarchive and the Wayback Machine: 
 Archived at Ghostarchive and the Wayback Machine: 
 Archived at Ghostarchive and the Wayback Machine:

External links

1964 births
Living people
American sportspeople convicted of crimes
Arizona Diamondbacks announcers
Arizona Diamondbacks coaches
Arizona Diamondbacks players
Baseball players from Scottsdale, Arizona
Baseball players from California
Chicago Cubs announcers
Chicago Cubs players
Gold Glove Award winners
Iowa Cubs players
Major League Baseball broadcasters
Major League Baseball first basemen
National League All-Stars
People from Tustin, California
Sportspeople from Orange County, California
Baseball players from Winston-Salem, North Carolina
Peoria Chiefs players
Pittsfield Cubs players
Saddleback Gauchos baseball players
San Diego State Aztecs baseball players
Hillsboro Hops
People from Antioch, Tennessee